"Seen It All" is a song by British singer songwriter Jake Bugg. It was released as the sixth single from his self-titled debut album (2012). It was released as a digital download in the United Kingdom on 25 February 2013. The song has peaked at number 61 on the UK Singles Chart. The song features drumming from young musician Chris "Bodge" Dunkley, who had made a name for himself on the Hexham jazz scene. The song also features in the TV series Alex Rider, when sung by the title character during two escape scenes.

Music video
A music video to accompany the release of "Seen It All" was first released onto YouTube on 24 February 2013 at a total length of three minutes. The video features English actor Michael Socha. The video was filmed in various locations around Glasgow, including the Glasgow University Union  and local beverage connoisseur Ciaran Anderson's flat.

Track listings

Charts

Certifications

Release history

References 

2012 songs
2013 singles
Jake Bugg songs
Songs written by Iain Archer
Songs written by Jake Bugg
Mercury Records singles